Philip "Little Farvel" Cohen alias Jack Kofsky (1906 or 1907 – September 15, 1949) was a figure from organized crime in New York in the 1930s, now considered a member of the so called Kosher Nostra. According to the authorities, Cohen, a former rackets collector, was a member of the criminal organization Murder, Inc., led by Louis Buchalter and, like the gang leader and other members of the organization, was involved in international drug trafficking .

International drug trafficking 
According to the findings of the Federal Bureau of Narcotics (FBN), the international drug trade intended for the USA in the 1920s and 1930s was largely controlled by the Kosher Nostra member Jacob Katzenberg, who was based in New York City. This supplied a large number of criminal gangs, including the organization around Louis Buchalter, to which Philip Cohen also belonged, with opium, which was initially obtained from Europe and later directly from China and then sold on nationally in the USA. The many murders carried out by Cohen's organization, which the press dubbed Murder, Inc., were largely based on enabling and covering up crimes of the criminal organization and the National Crime Syndicate, such as the drug trafficking organized by Katzenberg. This was actively supported by Murder, Inc. and can be seen as one of the main sources of income for the criminal organization in addition to the infiltration of unions and related industries - such as in particular the clothing industry in the Garment District (Manhattan) .
Philip Cohen and his accomplice Emanuel Weiss were heavily involved in the criminal organization's drug deals. The FBN first became aware of the group's machinations in 1935 when the remains of an opium processing plant were discovered by authorities after an explosion in a residential building on Seymour Avenue in New York City. In 1937, the FBN believed it had secured evidence of a violation of the US Narcotics Act by Cohen and Weiss when they managed to find Jacob Gottlieb at Rouses Point in New York State with a suitcase full of heroin. When he was arrested, he told the authorities that he had smuggled drugs from France through Canada to the USA for Cohen and Weiss and that the two were his clients. Shortly afterwards, while still in custody, Gottlieb committed suicide by hanging himself in his cell for fear of retaliation by Murder, Inc. against him or his family. No charges could be brought against Cohen and Weiss due to the death of the only witness .
In 1939, the two Murder, Inc. members, who had long been the focus of the FBN, were finally indicted for violations of the US Narcotics Act. During a house search, FBN investigators discovered a chemical plant used to stretch morphine and had secured evidence of the involvement of Weiss, Cohen and three other people named Samuel Bernstein, Abe "Little Yiddel" Lorber and Al Angelson. After the fugitives were arrested in 1939, the trial was scheduled for 1940.
Emanuel Weiss and Philip Cohen were released after paying bail, but did not appear at the trial because they had also been charged with the murder of Joseph Rosen, a former haulage owner, since May 1940 and wanted to evade the trial.
After several months of manhunt, New York police officers managed to arrest Cohen in a Brooklyn apartment during a nightly house search on November 30, 1940, and found the wanted man exhausted and under the influence of drugs. There was no sign of his accomplice Weiss. In February 1941, Philip Cohen and the three remaining defendants were sentenced to three to ten years in prison. Cohen was sentenced to ten years.

Murder of Joseph Rosen
In the mid-1930s, prosecutor William O'Dwyer, who had set himself the goal of taking action against organized crime, put the focus of his investigation on Louis Buchalter, the boss of Cohen. This resulted in particular in driving potential witnesses out of town or their being murdered. Buchalter saw danger in a businessman named Joseph Rosen, who had been informed of the gang leader's involvement in the infiltration of the unions and had returned to the city against his will. On September 13, 1936, on Buchalter's orders, Rosen was shot in his shop in Brownsville, New York City . Harry Strauss was supposedly commissioned with the planning and execution of the crime along with James Ferraco, Emanuel Weiss, Sholem Bernstein and Louis Capone. Along with Sholem Bernstein, Philip Cohen was seen as an escape driver and is said to have transported the perpetrators, who initially used a stolen escape vehicle, in his car after leaving the vehicle and helped them escape from the crime scene.
When the public prosecutor's office was able to prosecute those involved on the basis of the testimony of the contract killer Abe Reles, who had become an informant, Philip Cohen was initially included in the murder charge in 1940, but was later struck off the list of accused due to lack of evidence. Instead, he had already been convicted of drug smuggling. Cohen's accomplices Emanuel Weiss, Louis Capone and gang leader Louis Buchalter were sentenced to death for the murder of Rosen and in 1944, after two years of vehement but unsuccessful attempts to enforce a retrial, were executed in the electric chair in Sing Sing Prison.

Murder of Danny Fields and Louis Cohen 
Philip Cohen was also linked by investigators with the FBN to the double homicide of Danny Fields aka Isadore Friedman and Louis Cohen on January 28, 1939, and is believed to have been one of the shooters. However, in the absence of sufficient evidence, no charges could be brought against Cohen.

Assassination 
Philip Cohen was found dead on a Long Island road a few months after his release on September 15, 1949 . He had been shot in the head four times.
The authorities ruled out robbery and rather classified the act as a classic underworld-style execution; the perpetrators had no interest in various valuables that Cohen was carrying. Police officers later found Cohen's car with traces of blood on the passenger seat. Allegedly, Cohen was murdered in a manner similar to that of several Murder, Inc. victims who were shot dead by a perpetrator sitting behind them during a final drive.
However, prosecutor Burton Turkus, who served in the Joseph Rosen murder case, contradicted claims in the press that Cohen may have been murdered in retaliation for the conviction and execution of Louis Buchalter, Emanuel Weiss and Louis Capone to avoid the electric chair himself. In fact, Cohen never cooperated with the authorities, said Turkus. In typical underworld fashion, the accused kept silent about any offers made by the public prosecutor. The day Cohen was released from the dock for lack of evidence, he turned to Buchalter in the courtroom and assured him that he had not cooperated nor would cooperate.
The police failed to solve Cohen's murder. It was assumed, however, that after his release from prison, Cohen wanted to gain a foothold in the criminal milieu again and thereby pushed competitors out of their niche. In particular, Cohen, as the head of a criminal group, is said to have tried to blackmail betting shops and accountants.

References

American people of Russian descent
1900s births
1949 deaths
Jewish American gangsters
Murder, Inc.
Criminals from New York City
20th-century American Jews
Deaths by firearm in New York (state)